Lembaga Tabung Haji (Jawi: تابوڠ حاج ; Arabic صندوق الحج) also known as Tabung Haji or TH is the Malaysian hajj pilgrims fund board. It was formerly known as Lembaga Urusan dan Tabung Haji (LUTH). The main headquarters is located at Tabung Haji Tower, Jalan Tun Razak, Kuala Lumpur. Tabung Haji facilitates savings for the pilgrimage to Mecca through investment in Shariah-compliant vehicles. Through its subsidiaries, the company also engaged in other industries such as finance, hospitality, property, plantation and information technology.

Prior to the establishment of Lembaga Tabung Haji, there was no Islamic financial institution that provided services to the Muslim in this country to save for hajj expenses. Even though several banks were already operating, the Muslims were reluctant to use conventional banking for their hajj savings because they wanted to ensure that their hajj savings were free from riba (usury) in order to attain a Mabrur Hajj.

History

The idea to set up the Prospective Hajj Pilgrims Savings Corporation (Perbadanan Wang Simpanan Bakal-bakal Haji (PWSBH)) was triggered by a proposal made by the renowned Malay economist, the Royal Professor YM Ungku Abdul Aziz in December 1959 to the Federal Government of Malaya. 

The first step was taken with the establishment of PWSBH under Law No. 34, 1962, in 1963. The corporation was under the purview of the Ministry of Rural Development.

Beginning 30 September 1963, PWSBH created history by opening counters to collect deposits from prospective hajj pilgrims in the country. Malaysian Muslims were taught at an early age on the need to save in a Shariah-compliant organisation to prepare for their hajj.

When operations began in 1963, a total of 1,281 prospective pilgrims opened their accounts with a total savings of RM 46,610. Their main objective then was to ensure that their savings were secure and free of usury to enable them to fulfill the fifth Five Pillars of Islam and to attain a Mabrur Hajj. Dividend and bonuses were not in the mind at all, at that time.

The confidence displayed by the prospective pilgrims drove PWSBH to continue upgrading its services to ensure that it fulfilled the ‘fardu kifayah’ (religious duty of collective obligation). Since then, PWSBH continued to intensify efforts in attracting more Muslims to use the savings facility provided by the government to ensure that their savings were always ‘halal’ and safe.

In 1969, to further strengthen its role in coordinating the expending savings and hajj management, PWSBH was merged with the Hajj Affairs Management Office (Pejabat Urusan Hal Ehwal Haji ) which had been in operation since 1951 in Penang. This newly set up organisation was named Lembaga Urusan dan Tabung Haji (LUTH) and was later renamed as Lembaga Tabung Haji in 1995, known as Tabung Haji or by its acronym TH.

With the establishment of TH, the affairs related to Malaysians’ hajj pilgrimage became much easier and well-organised. Malaysian Muslims who are making their maiden trip to the Holy Land would have nothing to worry about because TH looks into all their needs including matters related to passport, hajj visa, transportation, accommodation in Makkah, Madinah, Mina, and Arafah as well as healthcare and hajj guidance.

Subsidiaries

Financial Institution
BIMB Holdings Berhad
Bank Islam Malaysia Berhad
Takaful Malaysia Berhad
BIMB Securities

Services
TH International Sdn Bhd

Hospitality
TH Hotel & Residence Sdn Bhd
TH Global Sdn Bhd
TH Travel & Services Sdn Bhd

Property Development and Construction
TH Properties Sdn Bhd
LTH Property Investment (L) Inc.
LTH Property Holdings Limited
LTH Property Holdings 2 Limited

Plantation
TH Plantations Berhad
TH Indo Industries Sdn Bhd
TH Indopalms Sdn Bhd
TH Estates (Holdings) Sdn Bhd
Deru Semangat Sdn Bhd

Information Technology
Theta Edge Berhad

Theta Edge Berhad is a subsidiary of Tabung Haji and involves in ICT service provider. The company listed on the Second Board of the Kuala Lumpur Stock Exchange in 1994 and moved to the Main Board in 1999 of the Bursa Malaysia Securities Berhad.

References

External links
Tabung Haji website

 
Federal ministries, departments and agencies of Malaysia
Islam in Malaysia
Government organizations related to the Hajj
1963 establishments in Malaysia
Government agencies established in 1963
Prime Minister's Department (Malaysia)